David Francis Williamson (born 15 December 1975) is a Hong Kong-born Northern Irish retired soccer player.

Club career
David was first spotted while playing in the Northern Ireland Milk Cup for Co. Fermanagh and was taken on by Castlereagh College in Belfast on their football course. Crusaders liked what they saw of David and snapped him up. When he was 18, he signed for Motherwell after a 2-week trial. However, Williamson struggled to make the breakthrough at Fir Park and only made 1 appearance in the first team. Roy McFarland brought him to Cambridge United but after a decent start, he dropped out of the starting XI and so went on a loan spell to Coleraine. He returned to Cambridge in time for the new season and got back into the first team and played in their first 15-20 games before unfortunately getting injured. Things were never the same after that so he took the decision to move to the land of his birth Hong Kong.

David spent a year and a half in Hong Kong  and played for Yee Hope and Instant-Dict F.C. He faced future teammate Kevin Hunt on his debut for Yee Hope. While in Hong Kong, he played twice for the Hong Kong national team in friendlies against Chinese clubs Guan-Jo and Xin-Xeng. He returned to Ireland and signed for Sligo Rovers in January 2000  on a non-contract basis, making his debut against Bohemians. He impressed so much in that match that Bohs offered him a contract. There was controversy over this and the Eircom League refused to register his transfer.   brought them to the High Court  and won the case but David was not allowed to play for Bohs for the rest of the season. Crusaders took him up North on loan for the remainder of the season.

On his return to Dalymount Park, he slotted in straight away and played in Bohs' European campaign in the wins over Aberdeen and Kaiserslautern and contributed to Bohs Eircom league and Cup double success . However, he fell out favour with Roddy Collins and moved to Bray Wanderers on deadline day in January 2001 . He helped Bray to a finish of 4th place in the table by the end of that season.

In January 2004, he returned to Hong Kong and played for Kitchee , finishing 2nd in the Hong Kong Premier league and FA Cup .

After leaving Hong Kong , He has had spells at Kettering in England, TP-47 in Finland and Hibernians F.C. of Malta. He made his debut for Hibernians F.C. of Malta in January 2006 against Birkirkara F.C. . He spent 8 months with the club winning the Maltese FA cup and finishing 2nd in the Premier league, before Retiring through injury in 2007 , he has since run his own Personal Training business and Sports Agency , Aspire Sports International .

References

Association footballers from Northern Ireland
League of Ireland players
Bohemian F.C. players
Motherwell F.C. players
Cambridge United F.C. players
Coleraine F.C. players
Sligo Rovers F.C. players
Expatriate sportspeople from Northern Ireland in Hong Kong
Crusaders F.C. players
Bray Wanderers F.C. players
Expatriate footballers in Hong Kong
Living people
1975 births
English Football League players
TP-47 players
Expatriate footballers in Finland
Association football midfielders